Blue Ridge is a ridge located in Adirondack Mountains of New York located in the Towns of Indian Lake and Lake Pleasant, east-northeast of Blue Mountain Lake.

References

Mountains of Hamilton County, New York
Mountains of New York (state)